Fidelis (Latin for "fidelity") is a given name  (usually male) and surname. The  equivalent is Fidélis in Portuguese or Fidel in Spanish.

Bearers of the name include:

Known by given name alone
 Saint Fidelis (disambiguation):
 Carpophorus and Fidelis, legendary associates of Felinus and Gratian (died c.250).
 Fidelis of Como (died c. 304), soldier-saint. 
 Fidelis (bishop of Mérida) (fl. 550s)
 Fidelis of Sigmaringen (1577 - 1622), Counter-Reformation martyr.
 Fidélis (footballer, 1944-2012), José Maria Fidélis dos Santos, Brazilian football defender
 Fidélis (footballer, born 1989), Philipe Fidélis dos Santos, Brazilian football striker
 Fidelis, pseudonym of Agnes Maule Machar (1837–1927), a Canadian writer.

Given name, with surname
 Fidelis Chojnacki(1906–1942),  a Polish Capuchin friar and priest.
 Fidelis Fernando (born 1948), a Sri Lankan  bishop
 Fidelis Gadzama (born 1979), Nigerian athlete and Olympic medalist. 
 Fidelis Irhene (born 1996) a Nigerian football player who plays for Doxa Katokopias. 
 Fidelis Justin Rasolonomenjanahary, a Malagasy politician. 
 Fidelis Júnior Santana da Silva (born 1981), known as "Juninho", a Brazilian footballer.
 Fidelis Leite Magalhães, Timor-Leste 
 Fidelis Makka (born 1950),  Military Governor of Benue State, Nigeria
 Fidelis Mhashu (died 2018), a Zimbabwean politician.
 Fidelis Morgan (born 1952), an English actress.
 Fidelis Ndyabagye (born 1950) a Ugandan athlete.
 Fidelis Obikwu (born 1960), an English athlete.
 Fidelis Oditah (born 1964), a Nigerian barrister and jurist.
 Fidelis Okoro, a Nigerian politician. 
 Fidelis Onye Som (born 1945) a Nigerian boxer. 
 Fidelis Oyakhilome,  (born 1939) a military governor of Rivers State, Nigeria.
 Fidelis Rakotonarivo (born 1956) a Madagascar bishop.
 Fidelis Saviour (born 1988) a Nigerian footballer.
 Fidelis Tapgun, a Nigerian politician and diplomat.
 Fidelis Uzochukwu Okafor, Nigerian academic and state governor.
 Fidelis Wainaina (1962–2008), founder of Maseno Interchristian Child Self Help Group

Middle name
 Eric Fidelis Alva (born 1970), U.S. Marine seriously injured in the Iraq War.  
 Jacob Fidelis Ackermann (1765–1815),  a German professor of anatomy and surgery. 
 José Maria Fidélis dos Santos (1944–2012),  a Brazilian footballer and coach. 
 Pius Fidelis Pinto (born 1960), an Indian priest and scholar of Christianity.
 Rogério Fidélis Régis (born 1976), known as "Rogério", a Brazilian footballer.

Surname
 Andressa Fidelis  (born 1994), a Brazilian  sprinter. 
 Cassandra Fidelis (1465–1558), Italian scholar
 Dimaku Fidelis  (born 1989), a Nigerian footballer. 
 Ercole dei Fidelis (c.1465–c.1504 or later), Italian goldsmith and engraver. 
 Gary Fidelis  (born 1964), a Malaysian field hockey player. 
 Thaís Fidélis (born 2001), a Brazilian artistic gymnast.

Masculine given names
Surnames